Team Specialized Designs for Women (UCI Code: TSW) was an elite women's professional road bicycle racing team licensed in Switzerland that competed in national events (NE), UCI-rated events (2.HC, 2.1, 2.2, 1.HC, 1.1 and 1.2) and UCI Women's Road World Cup (WC) events. After operating under various names for seven years, it disbanded at the end of the 2008 season.

Major wins
2007
Schönaich, Emma Pooley
Merdingen, Sarah Grab
Stage 6 U6 Cycle Tour Tidaholm, Catrine Josefsson 
Stage 3 Thüringen-Rundfahrt der Frauen, Emma Pooley
Wädenswil Cyclo-cross, Katrin Leumann
Steinmaur Cyclo-cross, Katrin Leumann
Sion Cyclo-cross, Katrin Leumann
Dagmersellen Cyclo-cross, Katrin Leumann
2008
Rounds 1, 2 & 3 Perth Criterium Series, Emma Pooley
Ahrweiler, Tanja Schmidt-Hennes
Trofeo Alfredo Binda-Comune di Cittiglio, Emma Pooley
Köln – Schuld – Frechen, Mirjam Hauser-Senn
Refrath, Tanja Schmidt-Hennes
Diessenhofen, Mirjam Hauser-Senn
Overall Tour de Bretagne, Emma Pooley
Stages 3 & 4a Tour de Bretagne
Hameln – Stadthagen, Tanja Schmidt-Hennes
Rhede, Tanja Schmidt-Hennes
Witten, Tanja Schmidt-Hennes
Nettetal, Tanja Schmidt-Hennes 
Stage 4 Tour de l'Ardèche, Emma Pooley
Schaan, Sarah Grab
Kärlich, Tanja Schmidt-Hennes

National champions
2007
 Swiss National Cyclo-cross Championship, Katrin Leumann

2008 team roster

Ages as of 1 January 2008.

References

External links
Official site

Cycling teams based in Switzerland
UCI Women's Teams
Defunct cycling teams based in Switzerland
Cycling teams established in 2002
Cycling teams disestablished in 2008
Specialized Bicycle Components